The Marijuana Conspiracy is a 2020 Canadian drama film, directed by Craig Pryce. Based on a true story, the film centres on a group of young women in 1972, who have been confined to a hospital for 98 days and made to smoke marijuana daily as part of a medical research study into the effects of cannabis on women.

Cast
The film's cast includes Tymika Tafari, Julia Sarah Stone, Morgan Kohan, Brittany Bristow, Kyla Avril Young, Marie Ward, Luke Bilyk, Alanna Bale, Greg Calderone, Paulino Nunes, Paula Boudreau, Derek McGrath and Jordan Todosey.

Release
The film premiered on December 7, 2019 at the Whistler Film Festival. It was picked up for commercial distribution by Samuel Goldwyn Films in 2021.

Reception
The film received two Canadian Screen Award nominations at the 9th Canadian Screen Awards in 2021, for Best Costume Design (Marie Grogan Hales) and Best Makeup (Sidney Armour).  Marijuana Conspiracy was also recognized with The ReFrame Stamp.

References

External links

2019 films
2019 drama films
Canadian drama films
Canadian films about cannabis
English-language Canadian films
Films directed by Craig Pryce
2010s English-language films
2010s Canadian films